Vega de Liébana is a municipality in the province and autonomous community of Cantabria, northern Spain.

See also 
 Pico Jano

References

External links
 Official website of the municipality

Municipalities in Cantabria